Coweta is a city in Wagoner County, Oklahoma, United States, a suburb of Tulsa. As of 2010, its population was 9,943. Part of the Creek Nation in Indian Territory before Oklahoma became a U.S. state, the town was first settled in 1840.

History

Before statehood, when the Five Tribes or Five Civilized Tribes were moved to Indian Territory from the Southeastern United States, the area that is now Coweta was designated as part of the Muscogee (Creek) Nation. Coweta was named after a Lower Creek town on the Chattahoochee River in southwestern Georgia. It was first settled by Muscogee about 1840.

In 1843, Robert Loughridge, a Presbyterian minister, arrived in the area and established a mission, named "Koweta". He had gained Creek Council approval for this the year before. Loughridge left Koweta in 1850 to supervise the newly completed Tullahassee Mission School. Both schools closed in 1861 at the outbreak of the American Civil War, when missionaries left the Territory.

In 1867 after the Civil War, the Creek Indians adopted a constitution related to the model of the United States. In addition to government, it established six districts for their nation. Everything northeast of the Arkansas River, including Tulsa, became the Coweta district. The political center of this district was located in a log courthouse on Coweta Creek, about a quarter mile west of present-day center of downtown Coweta. The post office was established on May 24, 1897, and took its name from Koweta Mission.

As a result of negotiations with the congressionally appointed Dawes Commission, regarding the allotment of tribal communal lands in 1897–1898, the Creek courts’ jurisdiction was turned over to the federal government.

Notable events in 1903 included the arrival of the Missouri-Kansas-Texas Railroad in Coweta; founding of the community's first newspaper, The Courier; construction of the first public school for whites; and installation of a telephone line.

The Creek Nation had already established numerous schools for Indian children in their territory well before this time. The tribal school system was funded from federal annuities paid following Creek removal to Indian Territory. By the later 19th century, the Creek Nation encouraged the founding of more schools: Wealaka  Mission School (1882), which replaced Tullahassee; Asbury Manual Labor School, transferred from Alabama; Harrell Institute (1881); Bacone College (1885); and Levering, Nuyaka, and Yuchi Mission schools. In this period, they had seven boarding schools for Indian children, three boarding schools for descendants of Creek Freedmen, including what was known after 1883 as the Tullahassee Manual Labor School; and 65 day schools.

Geography
Coweta is located at  (35.963155, -95.661586).

Climate

Demographics

As of the census of 2000,  7,139 people, 2,582 households, and 1,988 families were residing in the city. The population density was 942.1 people/sq mi (363.6/km). The 2,827 housing units averaged 373.1/sq mi (144.0/km). The racial makeup of the city was 75.78% White, 4.08% African American, 11.85% Native American, 0.21% Asian, 1.75% from other races and 6.32% from two or more races. Hispanics or Latinos of any race were 3.80% of the population.

Of the 2,582 households, 43.0% had children under 18 living with them, 58.5% were married couples living together, 13.9% had a female householder with no husband present, and 23.0% were not families. About 19.9% of all households were made up of individuals, and 6.6% had someone living alone who was 65 or older. The average household size was 2.74, and the average family size was 3.14.

In the city, the age distribution was 30.9% under 18, 9.6% from 18 to 24, 31.0% from 25 to 44, 20.0% from 45 to 64, and 8.6% who were 65 or older. The median age was 31 years. For every 100 females, there were 95.1 males. For every 100 females age 18 and over, there were 90.5 males.

The median income for a household in the city was $38,255, and for a family was $41,786. Males had a median income of $32,348 versus $21,772 for females. The per capita income for the city was $14,960. About 6.2% of families and 7.4% of the population were below the poverty line, including 7.4% of those under age 18 and 11.1% of those age 65 or over.

Schools

The Coweta Public School District is the 29th-largest school district in the state, and as of October 2007, the district had 3,161 prekindergarten through 12th-grade students enrolled in six different schools; the district is also the largest in Wagoner County.

Media
Coweta has one newspaper, the Coweta American. The paper is published every Wednesday. It is owned by BH Media Group.

Economy
Historically, Coweta's economy was based on agriculture' until the 1960s. Production of grain is still important, but cotton acreage has decreased greatly. Now, the city's largest employers are Coweta school system, Walmart (one retail store), and the City of Coweta. Many employed residents now commute to Tulsa, Broken Arrow, or Muskogee.

Government
Coweta has a council-manager form of government.

Points of interest

Coweta is home to two sites on the National Register of Historic Places list. The Koweta Mission Site was added to the NRHP in 1973, but today, only a cemetery remains. The other historical site located in Coweta is the First Presbyterian Church of Coweta, commonly known as the Mission Bell Museum, which was added to the NRHP in 2003, and is owned and operated by the City of Coweta.

Notable people
 William R. "Bill" Bright (October 19, 1921 – July 19, 2003), founder of Campus Crusade
 Rick Bryan (March 20, 1962 - July 25, 2009) was a two-time All-American for the Oklahoma Sooners, and 9-year  NFL player (Atlanta Falcons).
 Bruce Cowling (1919-1986), an actor, was born in Coweta.
 Crooked X, a rock band, was discovered on the CBS television's The Early Show.
 Lilah Denton Lindsey was a Creek, civic leader, and women's club organizer.
 George Milburn (1903 - 1966), author, was born and raised in Coweta.
 Louis Oliver (April 9, 1904 – May 10, 1991) was a Creek poet.
 Donald P. Sloat (1949 - 1970), born in Coweta, was posthumously awarded a Medal of Honor for act of valor in the Vietnam War.
 Stephanie Hollman (June 13, 1980), born in Coweta, is known for The Real Housewives of Dallas.

Edward Suddeth (birthdate unknown) was lynched in Coweta on October 22, 1911.<http://genealogytrails.com/oka/wagoner/news_crime.html></ref>

See also

References

External links
 City of Coweta 
 Encyclopedia of Oklahoma History and Culture - Coweta

 
Cities in Wagoner County, Oklahoma
Cities in Oklahoma
Tulsa metropolitan area
Oklahoma populated places on the Arkansas River